Dnipro is Ukrainian prospective surface-to-air missile of middle range. It was supposed to be mounted on Volodymyr Velykyi-class corvettes. 

The designer, Ukroboronservice, also developed the land-platform variant for this missiles.

December 1, 2016 was posted a message about successful launches of cruise missiles Neptune and anti-aircraft missiles Dnipro at a training range in the southern of Ukraine.

Tactical and technical characteristics 
 The maximum detection range of a target type of a tactical fighter:
 at an altitude of 7 km - not less than 150 km;
 at an altitude of 0,15 km - not less than 50 km;
 at an altitude of 0.02 km - not less than 28 km;
 Range of steady escort of tactical fighter - 120 km;
 Minimum height of target damage is 0.015 km;
 Maximum defeat height of the target is 25 km;
 Time of preparation (inclusion) of the complex for combat work - no more than 4 minutes.

Producers 
Medium range SAM  "Dnipro" is a product of joint venture of Ukrainian defense enterprises:
 Iskra SPC (multipurpose radar missile launching station) — Zaporizhia;
 SPP Aerotehnics-MLT (the station of combat control) — Kyiv;
 Luch Design Bureau (rockets) — Kyiv;
 DP LINDRTI (GSN developer) — Lviv;
 KrAZ (chassis) — Kremenchuk.
 Ukroboronservice (General project management)

See also 
 Volodymyr Velykyi-class corvette
 Neptune (cruise missile)
 Hrim (missile system)
 Dnepr (rocket)

References

Links 
 
 
 
 
 

Surface-to-air missiles of Ukraine